Valery Semenovich Durov is a Russian antiquarian, philologist, and academic (Honored Worker of Higher Professional Education of the Russian Federation). From 1992 until 2013, he was head of the Department of Classical Philology at St. Petersburg State University.

Career
Durov graduated from the Philological Faculty of Leningrad University in 1968, was in graduate school at the Department of Classical Philology and in 1974 he defended his thesis "The Tenth Satire of Juvenal".

His research interests include history and literature of ancient Rome, and he lectures and conducts seminars on the history of Roman literature and the various aspects of the Latin language (syntax of a simple sentence, case syntax, style, etc.).

Family
He is the father of Pavel Durov, the creator of the VK social network and the Telegram messaging service, as well as Nikolai Durov, a mathematician.

Key publications
 
 
 
 
 Римская поэзия эпохи Августа: уч. пособие. СПб., 1997. 228 с.
 
 
 The basics of Latin style. М.; СПб., 2004. 104 с.
 Antique literature: a tutorial. М.; СПб., 2004. 473 с; 2-е изд.: М.; СПб., 2005. (в соавт. с Г. Г. Анпетковой-Шаровой)

References

1945 births
Living people
Russian classical scholars
Russian literary historians
Russian philologists
Saint Petersburg State University alumni
Academic staff of Saint Petersburg State University
Scholars of Latin literature
Historians of ancient Rome